Eilema danieli is a moth of the subfamily Arctiinae. It was described by Sergius G. Kiriakoff in 1954. It is found in the Democratic Republic of the Congo.

References

danieli
Moths described in 1954
Insects of the Democratic Republic of the Congo
Moths of Africa
Endemic fauna of the Democratic Republic of the Congo